The 2020–21 VCU Rams men's basketball team represented Virginia Commonwealth University during the 2020–21 NCAA Division I men's basketball season. Their head coach was Mike Rhoades, in his fourth year as VCU head coach. The team played their home games at the Siegel Center in Richmond, Virginia, as a member of the Atlantic 10 Conference. In a season limited due to the ongoing COVID-19 pandemic, they finished the season 19–7, 10–4 in A-10 play to finish in second place. The Rams defeated Dayton and Davidson in the A-10 tournament before losing to St. Bonaventure in the championship. They received an at-large bid to the NCAA tournament as the No. 10 seed in the West region. Their game against Oregon in the first round was ruled a no-contest due to positive COVID-19 tests in the VCU program, thus ending their season and making VCU the first team ever to forfeit a game in the NCAA tournament.

Previous season
The Rams finished the 2019–20 season 18–13, 8–10 in A-10 play to finish in a tie for eighth place. As the No. 8 seed in the A-10 tournament, they were to play UMass in the second round, but the tournament was canceled due to the ongoing COVID-19 pandemic.

VCU began the season with a 6–0 record for the first time in program history, and were ranked as high as 20th in the nation. The Rams finished the season with a 2–7 record in their final nine games.

Offseason

Departures

Incoming transfers

2020 recruiting class

2021 Recruiting class

Preseason

Atlantic 10 media poll
The Atlantic 10 men's basketball media poll was released on November 9, 2020. VCU was picked to finish ninth.

Roster

Depth chart

Suspension of Jimmy Clark III
On February 3, 2021, in a post-game conference, head coach Mike Rhoades said that Jimmy Clark III was absent for the Rams' game against Rhode Island due to a "university suspension." Rhoades then said that he would "leave it at that" for the time being. On February 4, the university confirmed that Clark was no longer with the program, not giving more detail and indicating they were "not allowed to comment further on this matter."

Schedule and results
VCU originally had games scheduled against Charlotte, Tennessee, and LSU that were canceled due to positive COVID-19 tests. Additionally, a game against Louisiana that was canceled due to NCAA scheduling limitations.

|-
!colspan=12 style=| Non-conference regular season
|-

|-
!colspan=12 style=|Atlantic 10 regular season
|-

|-
!colspan=12 style=|Atlantic 10 tournament
|-

|-
!colspan=12 style=|NCAA tournament
|-

|-

Notes

Rankings

*AP does not release post-NCAA Tournament rankings

Statistics

See also 
 2020–21 VCU Rams women's basketball team

References

External links
 VCU Basketball

VCU
VCU Rams men's basketball seasons
VCU Rams men's basketball
VCU Rams men's basketball
VCU Rams men's basketball
VCU Rams men's basketball
VCU
VCU Rams